The Tasian culture is possibly one of the oldest-known Predynastic culture in Upper Egypt, which evolved around 4500 BC. It is named for the burials found at Deir Tasa, a site on the east bank of the Nile located between Asyut and Akhmim. There is no general agreement about the proposed "Tasian culture", and some scholars since Baumgartel in 1955 have suggested it is a part of the Badarian culture, rather than a separate entity.

The Tasian culture group is notable for producing the earliest black-topped pottery, a type of red and brown pottery, which has been painted black on its top and interior. This pottery is vital to the dating of the various predynastic Egyptian civilizations. Since all dates for the Predynastic period are tenuous at best, Flinders Petrie developed a system called Sequence Dating through which the relative date, if not the absolute date, of any given Predynastic site can be ascertained by examining the handles on pottery.

As the Predynastic period in ancient Egypt progressed, the handles on pottery evolved from functional to ornamental, and the degree to which any given archaeological site has functional or ornamental pottery can be used to determine the relative date of the site. Since there is little difference between Tasian and Badarian pottery, the Tasian Culture overlaps the Badarian place on the scale between Sequence Dating 21 and 29 significantly.

Excavations of Tasian burials have yielded a number of skeletons. The fossils are generally taller and more robust than later predynastic Egyptian specimens. In this regard, the Tasian skeletons are most similar to those associated with the Merimde culture. Furthermore, although the Tasian crania are dolichocephalic (long-headed) like many of the other predynastic skulls, they have a large and wide vault like the Merimde crania. Skulls excavated from Badarian, Amratian, and Natufian sites tend instead to be smaller and narrow.

Archaeological evidence has suggested that the Tasian and Badarian Nile Valley sites were a peripheral network of earlier African cultures that featured the movement of Badarian, Saharan, Nubian, and Nilotic populations. Bruce Williams, Egyptologist, has stated "The Tasian Period is significantly related to the Neolithic of Sudanese-Saharan tradition as found just north of Khartoum and near Dongola in Sudan".

References

External links
Tasian - digitalegypt.ucl.ac.uk

Predynastic Egypt
5th millennium BC
Archaeological cultures in Egypt
Upper Egypt